Norman Brown (born December 18, 1970) is an American smooth jazz guitarist and singer.

Career
Brown was born in Shreveport, Louisiana in 1970 and grew up in Kansas City, Kansas. When he was eight years old, he was attracted to his brother's acoustic guitar. He was inspired by Jimi Hendrix and the Isley Brothers. When he heard Wes Montgomery, he began to play jazz. He attended the Musicians Institute in Hollywood. After graduating in 1984, he joined the staff and was an instructor until 1998. In 1991 he signed with Mo Jazz, a division of Motown.

In 1992 he released his debut album, Just Between Us. Collaborators included Boyz II Men, Stevie Wonder, and Kenneth H. Williams. The album was produced by Norman Connors, a jazz drummer and producer who discovered Brown. In 1994 Brown released the album After the Storm, which gained critical success and was awarded jazz album of the year by Soul Train Music Awards. It also won a Gavin Radio Award by remaining on the charts for over two years. He followed this album with the 1996 release Better Days Ahead, which earned him a broader audience and the American Jazz Award. In 1999, he returned from a three year hiatus and signed with Warner Bros., releasing Celebration, which was produced by Norman Brown, Paul Brown, and Herman Jackson.

In 2002, he formed BWB with saxophonist Kirk Whalum and trumpeter Rick Braun, and they released the album Groovin' . During the summer of 2007, Brown had a No. 1 smooth jazz radio hit, "Let's Take a Ride", from the album Stay with Me, according to Radio and Records magazine. In 2008, the Verve Music Group re-released Just Between Us as part of its "Verve Originals" series. Brown's music can be heard during The Weather Channel's Local on the 8s segments. His song "Lydian" is included in their 2008 compilation album, The Weather Channel Presents: Smooth Jazz II. In 2011, Brown collaborated with Gerald Albright to record 24/7 which had a number one single, "In the Moment", and earned him a Grammy Award nomination.

Discography

as BWB (Braun-Whalum-Brown)

See also
 BWB
 List of smooth jazz performers

References

External links
 Official Website
Norman Brown at Discogs

1970 births
Living people
Musicians from Kansas City, Missouri
20th-century African-American male singers
American jazz singers
American jazz guitarists
Smooth jazz guitarists
Soul-jazz guitarists
Grammy Award winners
Musicians Institute alumni
Singers from Missouri
Guitarists from Missouri
Jazz musicians from Missouri
21st-century African-American male singers
21st-century American guitarists
BWB (band) members
African-American guitarists